German submarine U-716 was a Type VIIC U-boat built for Nazi Germany's Kriegsmarine for service during World War II.

Design
German Type VIIC submarines were preceded by the shorter Type VIIB submarines. U-716 had a displacement of  when at the surface and  while submerged. She had two shafts and two  propellers.

U-716 was fitted with five  torpedo tubes (four fitted at the bow and one at the stern), fourteen torpedoes, one  SK C/35 naval gun, 220 rounds, and two twin  C/30 anti-aircraft guns. The boat had a complement of between forty-four and sixty.

Service history
U-716 took part in ten patrols between 15 April 1943 and 8 May 1945. She had her only success sinking the US freighter Andrew G. Curtin when she attacked convoy JW 56A on 26 January 1944. She also took credit for the sinking of US patrol torpedo boat USS PTC-39 being transported by the freighter at the time. 
While in the Arctic sea on 23 April 1945, U-716 was hit by depth charges by a hunter-killer group. The damage was serious enough to require retreating to Narvik before schedule, but not enough to cause any further problems.

Fate
While in port awaiting repairs, VE Day occurred and the European theatre of the Second World War ended. Upon orders, Jürgen Thimme surrendered his vessel to the Allies in Narvik, Norway on 9 May 1945 and took her to Loch Eriboll in Scotland, where she was destroyed by aerial attack as part of Operation Deadlight on 11 December 1945.

Summary of raiding history

References

Notes

Citations

Bibliography

External links

1943 ships
U-boats commissioned in 1943
World War II submarines of Germany
Operation Deadlight
Ships built in Hamburg
German Type VIIC submarines
U-boats sunk in 1945
U-boats sunk by British aircraft
Submarines sunk by aircraft as targets
Maritime incidents in December 1945